Dexterity Island is an uninhabited island in the Qikiqtaaluk Region of Nunavut, Canada. It is located in Baffin Bay off the northeastern coast of Baffin Island.

History
An Inuit settlement existed on Dexterity Island, but left before the arrival of the Hudson's Bay Company. The group camped on the landward side in the winter and the eastern side in the summer.

References

External links 
 Dexterity Island in the Atlas of Canada - Toporama; Natural Resources Canada

Islands of Baffin Island
Islands of Baffin Bay
Uninhabited islands of Qikiqtaaluk Region